FC Tokyo Under−23 was a Japanese football club based in Tokyo. It was the reserve team of FC Tokyo and played in J3 League which they have done since their entry to the league at the beginning of the 2016 season. The club shared its home games between Ajinomoto Field Nishigaoka and the smaller Yumenoshima Stadium.

History
FC Tokyo joined J3 League in 2016 along with the reserve teams of neighbours Gamba Osaka and Cerezo Osaka. None of these clubs are eligible for promotion to J2 League additionally they can only field 3 players over the age of 23.

Last squad
2020 squad for 2020 J3 League

References

External links
FC Tokyo U23 Official website 

 
Football clubs in Osaka
J.League clubs
Association football clubs established in 2016
2016 establishments in Japan
Defunct football clubs in Japan
Association football clubs disestablished in 2020
2020 disestablishments in Japan